Tor Lundsten (16 February 1926 – 29 November 1970) was a Finnish rower. He competed in the men's eight event at the 1952 Summer Olympics.

References

1926 births
1970 deaths
Finnish male rowers
Olympic rowers of Finland
Rowers at the 1952 Summer Olympics
Sportspeople from Turku